is an anime television series which aired on Tokyo Channel 12 from March 21, 1979, to March 5, 1980. Produced by Toei Animation, with animation co-produced by Nippon Sunrise, consisting of 47 episodes.

Plot
In 1995, Earth has been conquered by the Zaar Empire from the planet Akron in the star system of Zaar. All Earth's cities have been destroyed, and its survivors live in shanty towns and villages. Kento, a war orphan, and his companions hide in a cave to escape bandits. In the cave they find the secret base of Doctor Earl from the planet Helios, another planet conquered by the Zaar. Doctor Earl had fled to Earth with him the greatest achievement of Helian technology: the super-robot Atlas, whose power increases in combination with the intelligent lion robot Beralios. When the robots combine with the Helian fighter Gumper, they form the mighty robot Daltanious. Doctor Earl entrusts the fight for Earth to Kento, a descendant of the Helian royal family.

Voice actors

Production

Concept
Tadao Nagahama influenced the series' artistry and direction, and its style resembles those of Voltes V and Combattler V.

The super robot Daltanious was formed from three components: Atlaus (the main robot), Gunper (the spaceship) and Beralios, the mechanical lion who was recovered after the first battle with Akron. The robot is named after D'Artagnan, the hero of The Three Musketeers. Daltanious was the first combining super-robot with an animal component and the first with a lion's head on its chest. The lion's head motif would be incorporated into several Brave series robots, including GaoGaiGar.

Toys
Like all Super Robot anime titles, Daltanious had a die-cast toy replica produced by Popy during its run. In 2011, a Daltanious toy was released by Bandai in their Soul of Chogokin line.

Weapons
 A single handed sword is summoned by the disk on Daltanious' right hip.
 A metal shield is summoned by the disk on Daltanious' left hip.
 Daltanious' punches are launched like rockets against opponents.
 Metal blades appear from the golden metal rings on Daltanious' forearms, and can be launched or combined with the Double Knuckle.
 A crossbow appears on Daltanious' right forearm, which shoots metal arrows.
 From the four crosses on Daltanious' shoulders and knees, four purple beams combine to form a cross-shaped laser beam.
 From the Beralios' mouth, a ball of fire is shot against opponents.
 From Beralios' mouth or eyes, a flamberge is summoned to attack Daltanious.
 From Daltanious' arms, a double pair of cannons fire repeated shots.
 From the right metal disk on Daltanious' right hip, a chain with a hook and sickle is summoned to grab opponents.
 When the Flaming Sword is summoned, a flaming beam stops opponents and Daltanious performs the Cross Slash.
 The Flame Sword is summoned with Daltanius' available power. He glows and flame appears above the sword, from which a larger Flame Sword is drawn.

Zaar Forces

Bemborgs
DarancheIts powers include flight, sickle arms and face tentacles.
GofunIts powers include a statue disguise, a cutlass and eye lasers.
GarnisIts powers include swimming, flight and electric hair.
GogondoruIts powers include flight, two missiles in each foot and mouth wind gusts.
GerzomIts powers include flight, green antennae energy bolts and torso energy beams.
Gagan Parasite formIts powers include energy absorbing mouth webs and eye electric lasers.
Gagan Bemborg formIts powers include eye lasers, flight and sonic waves from the wings.
UtsuborasIts powers include flight, limb retraction and head spikes.
GaigarIts powers include flight, green energy balls and pink electric bolts from the torso eye and five cable spears from the waist.
GarugadonIts powers include dividing into meteors, body spikes and a sword stored in the left hand.
GaruganIts powers include swimming, a slime-based body and six missile launchers in each forearm.
GuruzonIts powers include flight, a mace tail and finger missiles.
GaradagoIts powers include a neck drill, tentacles that emit electric shocks from the remote rock and burrowing.
GaniraIts powers include a wrecking ball, a crab claw for the left hand and flight.
ZurudooIts powers include flight, an electromagnetic beam from the head horn and lasers from its seven torso eyes.
DryzerIts powers include rockets from both mouths, flight and finger missiles.
ZasorisIts powers include burrowing, flight and head whirlwinds.
KragIts powers include turning into purple toxic gas, flight and regeneration.
Zeminal Form 1Its powers include a cicada form, flight and energy absorption.
Zeminal Form 2Its powers include three antennae rays, two abdomen missile launchers and pink eye lasers.
Asterioclone Form 1Its powers include dividing into starfish, a purple heat ray from the eye and regeneration.
Asterioclone Form 2Its powers include pectoral missiles, swimming and electric shocks from the hands.
VakyuraIts powers include flight, emitting radar waves to predict attacks and a spear.
BrianIts powers include burrowing, dividing into robot cats and a blue laser blade in the torso.
ZarusIts powers include flight, pectoral missiles and purple lasers from both torso eyes.
MeralianIts powers include mouth flames, eye lasers and high-jumping.
SetraIts powers include burrowing, four thorny tentacles and ice beams from the side mouths.
Qukong Form 1Its powers include a plant pod form, six fly-trap arms which emit electric shocks and burrowing.
Qukong Form 2Its powers include sword hands on chains, torso missiles and pink eye lasers.
TeragamedonIts powers include mouth flames, flight and heat resistance.
DamuraIts powers include flight and pectoral missiles.
DeguIts powers include flight, green lasers from the mammary glands and eyes and back-throwing daggers.
ShurugaIts powers include flight, two scythe blades on each wrist and electric tentacles from the hips.
GurozaurusIts powers include flight, a mace and a freezing cannon and drill in the mouth of the lizard lower half.

Twinborgs
UnitogerasIts powers include pectoral lasers and machine guns, flight, a double-headed chariot horse with spiked wheels and mouth lasers and a constricting, bladed tail.
QumIts powers include flight, a machine gun for the right arm and rotating spikes in the torso.
GarufuaIts powers include flight, a lance for the right arm and a round shield for the left arm.
BaroomIts powers include swimming, a green laser from the eye and torso missiles.
GyarabaIts powers include flight, crescent energy blasts from the pincer claws and waist jaws.
JorukaIts powers include flight, green energy beams from the abdomen and eyes and mouth flames.
CharadeIts powers include toxic gas and energy beams from the abdomen mouth, flight and eye lasers.
DararaIts powers include flight, swimming and a whip.
Zaar Dan and ZaaraIts powers include both include flight, a round shield and a trident.
BalgaIts powers include a tank for the lower half armed with missiles and a dragon headed flamethrower, two laser guns at the waist and three laser guns in each shoulder.
GingerIts powers include flight, a double-sided lance and pink mouth flames.
ZobyuIts powers include flight, torso mines and foot missiles.
BronzorIts powers include flight, two missile launchers in the abdomen, an extendable arm in each hip which emits electricity, and twin broadswords.

Mecha leaders
Deathark 1Its powers include a cutlass and a round skull shield which fires lasers from the eye sockets.
Deathark 2Its powers include a pair of broadswords, flight and eye lasers.
Deathark 3Its powers include a sword, high-jumping and a round skull shield.
Dormen 1Its powers include a sword and a mouth energy beam.
Dormen 2Its powers include a yellow laser sword, green electric lasers from the eyes and flight.

References

External links
 
 

1979 anime television series debuts
1980 Japanese television series endings
Adventure anime and manga
Discotek Media
Super robot anime and manga
Television series set in 1995
Toei Animation television
Sunrise (company)
TV Tokyo original programming